Siniva Marsters (born 7 October 1980) is a former Cook Islander female athlete who competed in discus throw, hammer throw and shot put.

Marsters was educated at Tereora College, and subsequently trained in New Zealand, Australia, and Europe. She first represented the Cook Islands internationally at the Coca Cola Games in Fiji in 1994. Since 2000 she has worked for the Cook Islands Sports and National Olympic Committee. In 2018 she became acting secretary-general following the dismissal of Robert Graham. In 2019 she moved to Suva, Fiji for a position with the Oceania National Olympic Committees.

Achievements

See also
List of Cook Islands records in athletics

References

External links
 

1980 births
Living people
Cook Island female athletes
World Athletics Championships athletes for the Cook Islands
Athletes (track and field) at the 2002 Commonwealth Games
Commonwealth Games competitors for the Cook Islands